The Alfred High School (also known as Mohandas Gandhi High School) in Rajkot is one of the oldest educational institutions in India today.

History
This school was constructed during British rule in India by political agent Kernel Singh, and was the first English school in the saurashtra (region). Originally called Rajkot English School, it was founded on 17 October 1853, and later became a full-fledged high school. By 1868 it came to be known as Rajkot High School, and was named Alfred High School in 1907. The present buildings of the Alfred High School were built for Kathiawar by the Nawab of Junagadh, Nawab Nawab Sir Muhammad Bahadur Khanji Babi, and was named Prince Alfred, the Duke of Edinburgh, as a memorial. This school was opened in January, 1875 by Sir Philip Wodehouse, Governor of Bombay.

Mohandas Gandhi
Mahatma Gandhi graduated from Rajkot High School in 1887 at age 18. Accounts vary on Gandhi's time at the school. Several accounts suggest he was a quiet and academically unremarkable student who did not participate in sports or extracurricular activities. Gandhi said of his schooling, "I had not any high regard for my ability. I was to be astonished whenever I won prizes and scholarships". However, Rajmohan Gandhi suggests that this view comes from a misreading of his "self-deprecating" autobiography. Out of 38 students who had passed the high school entrance examination, Gandhi was one of only two students in his year to matriculate. Following graduation Gandhi enrolled at the Samaldas College in Bhavnagar, where he stayed for one term before travelling to London.

Following India's independence in 1947, the school was renamed the "Mohandas Gandhi High School" in honour of Gandhi.

In 2017, the school was closed and announced that it will be converted into museum.

Notable alumni
 S. R. Rana, Indian political activist

See also
 The Rajkumar College

References

Education in Rajkot
High schools and secondary schools in Gujarat
Educational institutions established in 1853
Schools in Colonial India
Boys' schools in India
1853 establishments in India
Government schools in India
Schools in the princely states of India